Gianni Maria Covatta (born 11 June 1956), best known as Giobbe Covatta, is an Italian stand-up comedian, actor, writer and politician.

Life and career 
Born in Taranto and raised in Naples, after appearing in a number of other variety shows Covatta he had his breakout in 1990 as a recurring guest in the Canale 5 talk show Maurizio Costanzo Show, where he reads his compositions inspired by the Bible. These sketch eventually inspired a book, Parola di Giobbe, which was released in 1991 and got an immediate success, selling over a million copies and getting over thirty editions. In the later years Covatta published other books, notably Pancreas, a parody of Edmondo De Amicis' Heart, and was active as an actor in films, television series and on stage.

In 2006, Covatta was elected councilor of the Federation of the Greens party in the Rome local elections. In 2015, he was elected national spokesperson of the party, still maintaining he does not consider himself a politician.

References

External links
 

1956 births
Living people
People from Taranto
Italian male film actors
Italian male stage actors
Italian male television actors
Italian male comedians
Federation of the Greens politicians
Italian humorists
Italian male writers